The Copa Mercosur ("Mercosur Cup") was a football competition played from 1998 to 2001 by the traditional top clubs from Brazil, Argentina, Paraguay, Uruguay and Chile. The competition was created by CONMEBOL to generate TV money to the participating teams, but it went beyond and ended up, together with the Copa Merconorte, as natural replacement to the CONMEBOL Cup. These two, Copa Merconorte and Copa Mercosur, were replaced in 2002 by the Copa Sudamericana.

Format
Twenty teams played in the tournament. The teams were divided in five groups of four teams each and the matches were played in two legs. The group winners and the best three runners-up qualified for the quarterfinals. The quarterfinals, the semifinals were played in two legs. In 1998 and 2000 the finals were played in three legs. In 1999 and 2001 the finals were played in two legs.

Final venues 
Throughout the brief history of the competition a total of five venues were used to host the final series:

Finals

Performances

By club

By country

See also 
 Copa CONMEBOL
 Copa Merconorte
 Torneio Mercosul

References
 Copa Mercosur at RSSSF

 

Defunct CONMEBOL club competitions
International club association football competition records and statistics